The 2015 BYU Cougars women's soccer team represented BYU during the 2015 NCAA Division I women's soccer season. The Cougars were coached for a 21st consecutive season by Jennifer Rockwood, who was co-coach in 1995 and became the solo head coach in 1996. Before 1995 BYU women's soccer competed as a club team and not as a member of the NCAA. The Cougars enter the 2015 season having won three consecutive West Coast Conference championships and having made the NCAA Tournament each of the last three seasons and in 16 of the 20 seasons that Rockwood has been the head coach. The Cougars also come in having been picked to win the 2015 WCC women's soccer crown. On the last day of the season BYU won their fourth consecutive WCC soccer title to automatically qualify for the NCAA Tournament. BYU advanced to the second round of the College Cup where they were defeated by Stanford. BYU finished the season at 16–3–2.

Media

Television & Internet Streaming
Every BYU women's soccer home games was shown live on BYUtv or TheW.tv. Information on these television broadcasts and other internet streams can be found below.

Nu Skin Cougar IMG Sports Network

For a second consecutive season the Cougar IMG Sports Network will air BYU Cougars women's soccer games. Greg Wrubell provided play-by-play for most games. Former men's assistant coach Hugh Van Wagenen (typically home games) and Colette Jepson Smith (typically road games) acted as analysts. Cougar IMG increased the number of games broadcast from 13 to at least 21. The Cougars also expanded their broadcast territory. After being solely online in 2014, Cougar IMG broadcasts began airing on ESPN 960, joining BYU baseball on the network. 20 of the 21 Cougar IMG broadcasts were streamed online at byucougars.com and on the ESPN 960 player. The UNLV match was available only on the ESPN 960 player. On September 24 BYU Radio also picked up the Cougar IMG broadcasts, simulcasting 8 of the matches, giving the Cougars nationwide coverage on Sirius XM 143 and on Dish Network.

Schedule
 *- Denotes WCC game
x- Denotes Cougar IMG Sports Network/ESPN 960 broadcast
y- Television Broadcast
z- Internet Stream

x-Exhibition: Blue/White Classic
Broadcasters: Greg Wrubell & Amber Wadsworth (ESPN 960)

xy-Exhibition: Arizona
Series History: BYU leads series 10–1–1
Broadcasters: Spencer Linton, Natalyn Lewis, & Lauren Francom (BYUtv)Greg Wrubell & Hugh Van Wagenen (ESPN 960)

x-Outrigger Resorts Soccer Classic: #18 California
Series History: BYU leads series 3–1
Broadcasters: Greg Wrubell & Colette Jepson Smith (ESPN 960)

xy-Colorado
Series History: BYU leads series 3–2–1
Broadcasters: Spencer Linton, Natalyn Lewis, & Lauren Francom (BYUtv/BYU Radio)Greg Wrubell & Hugh Van Wagenen (ESPN 960)

xz-Nebraska
Series History: Nebraska leads series 3–1
Broadcasters: (Huskers NSide {$- subscription service})- video onlyGreg Wrubell & Colette Jepson Smith (ESPN 960)

xy-Utah/Deseret First Duel
Series History: BYU leads series 19–7–1
Broadcasters: Spencer Linton, Natalyn Lewis, & Lauren Francom (BYUtv/BYU Radio)Robbie Bullough & Erica Owens (ESPN 960)

x-Stanford
Series History: BYU leads series 3–1
Broadcasters: Greg Wrubell & Jennie Smith (ESPN 960) 
BYU and Stanford were scheduled to play each other in the final match of the Outrigger Resorts Soccer Classic, but mother nature had other plans. Rain from Tropical Depression Kilo caused massive flooding and made the pitch unplayable. The two teams decided to reschedule with a home-and-home series beginning in Stanford September 7.

xy-Utah State
Series History: BYU leads series 11–0
Broadcasters: Spencer Linton, Natalyn Lewis, & Lauren Francom (BYUtv)Greg Wrubell & Hugh Van Wagenen (ESPN 960)

x-UNLV
Series History: BYU leads series 14–1–1
Broadcasters: Robbie Bullough & Hugh Van Wagenen (ESPN 960)

xy-Oregon State
Series History: BYU leads series 1–0
Broadcasters: Spencer Linton, Natalyn Lewis, & Lauren Francom (BYUtv)Greg Wrubell & Hugh Van Wagenen (ESPN 960)

xz-Cal Poly
Series History: BYU leads series 4–0–1
Broadcasters: Dave Grant (BigWest.tv)Greg Wrubell & Colette Jepson Smith (ESPN 960/BYU Radio)

x-Long Beach State
Series History: BYU leads series 5–2
Broadcasters: Kevin Nielsen & Colette Jepson Smith (ESPN 960)

xz-*Gonzaga
Series History: BYU leads series 7–0
Broadcasters: Video only (TheW.tv)Greg Wrubell & Colette Jepson Smith (ESPN 960/BYU Radio)

xz-*Portland
Series History: BYU leads series 5–4
Broadcasters: Adam Linnman & Erin Dees (TheW.tv)Greg Wrubell & Colette Jepson Smith (ESPN 960/BYU Radio)

xz-*San Diego
Series History: BYU leads series 5–2
Broadcasters: Spencer Linton, Natalyn Lewis, & Lauren Francom (BYUtv)Greg Wrubell & Hugh Van Wagenen (ESPN 960/BYU Radio)

xy-*Pacific
Series History: BYU leads series 5–1
Broadcasters: Spencer Linton, Natalyn Lewis, & Lauren Francom (BYUtv)Greg Wrubell & Hugh Van Wagenen (ESPN 960/BYU Radio)

xz-*San Francisco
Series History: BYU leads series 6–0
Broadcasters: George Devine & Joe Dugan (TheW.tv)Greg Wrubell & Colette Jepson Smith (ESPN 960/BYU Radio)

z-*Santa Clara
Series History: Santa Clara leads series 6–1–2
Broadcasters: David Gentile (TheW.tv)

xy-*Pepperdine
Series History: Series even 3–3
Broadcasters: Jarom Jordan, Natalyn Lewis, & Lauren Francom (BYUtv)Greg Wrubell & Hugh Van Wagenen (ESPN 960/BYU Radio)

xy-*Loyola Marymount
Series History: BYU leads series 5–1
Broadcasters: Spencer Linton, Natalyn Lewis, & Lauren Francom (BYUtv)Greg Wrubell & Hugh Van Wagenen (ESPN 960/BYU Radio)

xz-*Saint Mary's
Series History: BYU leads series 4–0–1
Broadcasters: Robbie Bullough & Amber Wadsworth (TheW.tv)Greg Wrubell & Hugh Van Wagenen (ESPN 960)

xy-College Cup: Utah Valley
Series History: BYU leads series 1–0
Broadcasters: Spencer Linton, Natalyn Lewis, & Lauren Francom (BYUtv)Robbie Bullough & Hugh Van Wagenen (ESPN 960)

x-College Cup: Stanford
Series History: Stanford leads series 4–3
Broadcasters: Jack Follman and Kevin Denny (Pac-12.com) 
Greg Wrubell & Colette Jepson Smith (ESPN 960/BYU Radio)

Roster

References

2015 in sports in Utah
2015 West Coast Conference women's soccer season
2015 team